Khanal is a common surname among the hill brahmins (पहारी ब्राह्मण) and some hill jaisi and kumai of Nepal and some northern Indian states. Khanal is fataha The Khanals belonged to the Thar Ghar aristocracy group which assisted the rulers of the Gorkha Kingdom.

Notable people with the name include:
Dev Khanal (born 2005), Nepalese cricketer
Shambhu Prasad Khanal, Nepali Scientist & Researcher.
Basu Khanal (Nabin), Nepalese Entrepreneur
Dipendra K. Khanal, Nepalese film director
Jhala Nath Khanal, Nepalese politician, Prime Minister of Nepal for part of 2011
Rewati Raman Khanal, ex-chief Secretary to the King Birendra of Nepal
Sardar Yadunath Khanal, pioneer diplomat; ex-Foreign Affair Secretary of Nepal; ex-Ambassador to US, India, and China

References

Ethnic groups in Nepal
Bahun
Nepali-language surnames
Surnames of Nepalese origin
Khas surnames